Booton is a surname. Notable people with the surname include:

Harold Booton (1906–1976), English footballer
Joseph Booton (actor) (born 1987), British actor and puppeteer
Joseph F. Booton (1897–1983), American architect and painter
Walter Booton (born 1941), Irish cricketer

See also
Bolton (surname)